Le Petit Quotidien is a French daily newspaper for 6- to 10-year-old children. It was founded in 1998 by Play Bac Presse, on the model of Mon quotidien, a daily newspaper for 10- to 14-year-old children, which was launched in 1995. It is sold only by subscription.

The paper is published daily, Mondays to Saturdays. It consists of four pages for "ten minutes' daily reading".

The publisher is Jérôme Saltet, editor-in-chief is François Dufour, two of the three people who set up Play Bac en 1985.

Play Bac Presse also publishes several special editions, each in a magazine format on a particular theme, such as animals, history, geography, science, English language. Each is in a magazine format of 50 illustrated pages. Games pages, with hidden answers, let the child check their knowledge.

In 1999, Le Petit Quotidien won the Grand Prix des Médias CB News for Best New Publication of the Year.

In 2020, the circulation of Le Petit Quotidien was of 51,326 copies.

References

External links 
  Official website

1998 establishments in France
Newspapers established in 1998
Daily newspapers published in France